Oxuderces dentatus, is a species of goby found in the Indo-West Pacific from India, to Viet Nam, to Macao, China, Malaysia and Indonesia.

Size

Etymology
The fishes species name meaning toothed, referring to the large canine teeth of upper jaw

References

Taxa named by Joseph Fortuné Théodore Eydoux
Taxa named by Louis François Auguste Souleyet
Fish described in 1850
Oxudercinae